Claude Augustus Swanson (March 31, 1862July 7, 1939) was an American lawyer and Democratic politician from Virginia. He served as U.S. Representative (1893-1906), Governor of Virginia (1906-1910), and U.S. Senator from Virginia (1910-1933), before becoming U.S. Secretary of the Navy under President Franklin D. Roosevelt from 1933 until his death. Swanson and fellow U.S. Senator Thomas Staples Martin led a Democratic political machine in Virginia for decades in the late 19th and early 20th century, which later became known as the Byrd Organization for Swanson's successor as U.S. Senator, Harry Flood Byrd.

Early and family life
Claude Swanson was born to the former Catherine Rebecca Pritchett (1834-1873) and her husband John Muse Swanson (1829-1914) in Swansonville, Pittsylvania County, Virginia on March 31, 1862. His great-grandfather William Swanson had moved to Pittsylvania from Albemarle County, Virginia, had farmed a plantation using slave labor, represented Pittsylvania County in the Virginia General Assembly, and advocating for building a railroad between Richmond and Danville. John M. Swanson, who owned slaves in 1850 and 1860, served in the 5th Virginia Cavalry and 21st Virginia Infantry during the American Civil War. After the war, he worked with his brother as merchants and tobacco manufacturers, J.M. Swanson & Bro. in Swansonville. John and Catherine Swanson had three other sons who survived to adulthood, as well as three daughters: William Graves Swanson (1860-1934), John Pritchett Swanson and Henry Clay Swanson (1870-1952) and sisters Annie Blanche Swanson (1864-1948), Sallie Hill Swanson (1869-1950) and Julia Benson Swanson (1869-1933). Two siblings did not survive to adulthood.

Claude Swanson married Elizabeth Deane Lyons on December 11, 1894 in the District of Columbia. She died on July 13, 1920. He married her widowed sister Lulie Lyons Hall (1867-1953) three years later, and she survived him. Swanson had met them both while studying at Randolph Macon Academy, for their mother ran a boardinghouse to support her family.

Career

Most Swanson men were Democrats and merchants in southwestern Virginia after the American Civil War. Commerce was the family business. A Swedish ancestor had moved from Philadelphia to southwestern Virginia in the 17th century to farm, as well as trade tobacco (and supply farmers with goods they needed). His grandfather had appeared as a "Tobacconist" in the 1850 U.S.Census, and the same label was used for his father in the 1860 census. His brother William G. Swanson later ran the wholesale Swanson Brothers Company, and served as chief clerk at the White Rock Indian Reservation in Utah during the administration of Democratic President Grover Cleveland. John Pritchett Swanson operated the Swanson Supply Company, a wholesale grocery and farmers supply business, and the family also had interests in the South Atlantic Lumber Company and Clement Lumber Company in Greensboro, North Carolina.

Merchant to teacher to lawyer
Swanson studied under Celestia Parrish then worked for his father in the family business, and taught as a schoolteacher himself for two years (for $30/month when he was 15 and 16 years old) when the bright tobacco market collapsed in 1876.

When Virginia's fiscal crisis meant teachers were not paid, and having earned enough to fund his further studies, Swanson entered the new state agricultural college in Blacksburg, Virginia Polytechnic Institute and State University (or Virginia Tech). Another family financial crisis led him and his brother to work in Danville as clerks in John Carter's grocery.

Four Danville Methodists lent Swanson funds to attend Randolph Macon College in Ashland. He graduated in 1885 after winning oratorical prizes and editing the college newspaper as well as the Hanover and Caroline News. He then went to Charlottesville and received a law degree from the University of Virginia.

After admission to the Virginia Bar, Swanson set up a legal practice in Chatham, the Pittsylvania county seat.

Congressman and Virginia politician
The young orator Claude Swanson had drawn the attention of Democratic party politicians in Richmond when he was studying in Ashland just up the railroad line. He won his first public office in 1892, a seat in the U.S. Congress representing Virginia's 5th congressional district. Swanson would serve seven terms in the U.S. House of Representatives, from 1893 until 1906. The district extended from Pittsylvania and Franklin counties into the Republican-leaning mountain counties of Floyd, Carroll and Grayson. Swanson survived two close election contests.

During the 1893 depression, Swanson became Virginia's most outspoken congressman endorsing William Jennings Bryan's inflationary fiscal reforms, i.e. allowing both silver and gold as legal tender. By 1896, Swanson had allied himself with Henry D. Flood, James Hay, Francis Lassiter and Thomas Staples Martin (whom he helped elect to the Senate in 1893).

Although his family's mercantile background had shown Swanson the importance of credit, his views (and those of his allies) outraged the conservative creditor class. Railroad developer Joseph F. Bryan, who owned the Richmond Times analogized Swanson to communists, anarchists and repudiators of debt." Congressman Swanson also endorsed free rural mail delivery, aid to rural banks, graduated federal income taxes (that became the 16th Amendment), reduced federal excise taxes and direct election of U.S. Senators (that became the 17th Amendment). He rose to influence on the House Ways and Means Committee and as proto-party whip. When the Spanish–American War in 1898 stimulated demand for farm products, the family farms again prospered and his brothers opened a wholesale grocery in Danville.

In 1903 Swanson bought Eldon, a plantation in Pittsylvania County, Virginia, built by the Whittle family for whom Chatham's Whittle Street is named. He lived there (when not in Washington, D.C.) most of the rest of his life. Swanson also entered into various real estate consortiums with Flood and his nephew, Harry F. Byrd.

Governor
Swanson's attempt to become Governor of Virginia in 1901 failed. However, after the Virginia Constitution of 1902 disenfranchised many African American and poor white voters, he won the Democratic primary in 1905. In the general election he defeated Republican Lunsford L. Lewis of Rockingham County by a nearly 2 to 1 margin.

Claude Swanson became the 45th Governor of Virginia, serving from 1906 until 1910. He was known as a progressive: reducing railroad rates and reorganizing the new State Corporation Commission, adding more capable school superintendents from his position on the State Board of Education (and funding their salaries), and building roads, schools and a tuberculosis sanatorium, reorganizing the state Board of Health, and establishing a Board of Charities and Corrections with later became the Department of Public Welfare. However, this was also an era of increased racial polarization in Virginia, and under Swanson and his lieutenant governor James Taylor Ellyson, African American schools received far fewer funds, and the state's eugenics program would flower in the 1920s.

U.S. Senator
Senator John W. Daniel died in office in June 1910. In August 1910, his successor as governor William Hodges Mann appointed Swanson to fill the vacancy until the end of Daniel's term on March 3, 1911. In February 1911, Gov. Mann appointed Swanson to the term Daniel for which Daniel had been reelected before his death, which began on March 4, 1911. Swanson won a non-binding primary for the seat in September 1911, and in January 1912, the Virginia General Assembly ratified the primary results by electing Swanson to the remainder of the term, which ended on March 3, 1917.

Swanson continued to win reelection, and represented Virginia in the U.S. Senate from 1910 until 1933. Fellow Progressive Virginian Woodrow Wilson won the 1912 Presidential election, so Swanson supported successful reforms in child labor and banking laws, reduced tariffs and federal funding of highway construction. He and Virginia's other Senator Thomas Staples Martin also supported expansion of the Norfolk Naval Base and the League of Nations. Swanson publicly opposed women's suffrage and what became the 19th Amendment, although he advised President Wilson privately concerning its passage.

During the Republican administrations of the 1920s, Swanson's gained seniority in the Senate, and served on the Senate Foreign Relations Committee. Swanson continued to advocate for the U.S. Navy, particularly as Japanese aggression in the Pacific threatened American commercial interests. He argued for a "treaty navy". His familiarity with the 1922 Washington agreements and those of the London Treaty (1930) led President Herbert Hoover (though of the opposing political party) to appoint Swanson as an American delegate to the unsuccessful Geneva Disarmament Conference of 1932.

When the Great Depression hit and voters elected Democrat Franklin D. Roosevelt President, Swanson became Secretary of the Navy, serving from 1933 until his death in 1939. Harry F. Byrd, who had succeeded to leadership of Martin's political organization after Martin's death, succeeded Swanson in the Senate, but became a leading critic of the New Deal. As Naval Secretary, Swanson oversaw passage and implementation of the largest U.S. peacetime naval appropriations up to that time.

Death and legacy
 
Ill for several months, Swanson died at Herbert Hoover's Rapidan Camp (which was then available for use by the Roosevelt Administration) in Criglersville, Madison County, Virginia on July 7, 1939. The 77 year old had also visited Shenandoah National Park and reviewed work performed by the Civilian Conservation Corps. His funeral was held in the chamber of the U.S. Senate. Then his corpse was taken to Richmond and buried in Hollywood Cemetery.

The Library of Virginia holds his executive papers. In 1992, Virginia erected a highway marker near Eldon to commemorate his service.

Arlington, Virginia named Swanson Middle School in his honor. The U.S. Navy also named a destroyer  for him.

Short-lived Swanson County, Oklahoma, was also named for him, while he was still alive.

Electoral history

1892; Swanson was elected to the U.S. House of Representatives with 53.91% of the vote, defeating Populist Benjamin T. Jones.
1894; Swanson was re-elected with 52.34% of the vote, defeating Republican G.W.Cornett, Independent G.W. Hale, and Populist W.T. Shelton.
1896; Swanson was re-elected with 50.98% of the vote, defeating Republican John Robert Brown.
1898; Swanson was re-elected with 57.02% of the vote, defeating Republican Edmund Parr, Populist R.A. Bennett, Independent Republican R.O. Martin, and Independent C.T. Seay
1900; Swanson was re-elected with 58.14% of the vote, defeating Republican John R. Whitehead.
1902; Swanson was re-elected with 60.8% of the vote, defeating Republican Beverly A. Davis and Populist Dan Dickerson.
1904; Swanson was re-elected with 64.98% of the vote, defeating Republican J.B. Stovall.
1905; Swanson was elected Governor of Virginia with 64.51% of the vote, defeating Republican Lunsford L. Lewis and Socialist Labor B.D. Downey.

References

Further reading
 Claude A. Swanson of Virginia: A Political Biography, Henry C. Ferrell Jr., The University Press of Kentucky, 1985

External links

|-

|-

|-

|-

|-

|-

|-

1862 births
1939 deaths
Democratic Party governors of Virginia
United States Secretaries of the Navy
American people of Swedish descent
Virginia lawyers
University of Virginia School of Law alumni
Virginia Tech alumni
Democratic Party United States senators from Virginia
People from Pittsylvania County, Virginia
Franklin D. Roosevelt administration cabinet members
Democratic Party members of the United States House of Representatives from Virginia
19th-century American politicians
19th-century American lawyers
20th-century American politicians